M.C. Levee (January 18, 1891, Chicago – May 24, 1972, Palm Springs, California) was born Michael C. Levee.

Beginning his career as a prop man, Levee worked his way up to an executive at several different film studios, including First National Pictures, United Artists Studios, and Paramount Pictures. Levee was one of the original 36 founding members of the Academy of Motion Picture Arts and Sciences (AMPAS) and served as its third president from 1931 to 1932.

Levee was also one of Hollywood's top agents until his retirement in 1956, working with such stars as Mary Pickford and Joan Crawford.

Personal life 
Levee was one of six children growing up in Chicago. He had four brothers named Louis, George, Eddie and Sidney and a sister named Rose Levee. He was married to Rose (Mimi) Levee and had 2 sons. His oldest son, Michael Levee Jr., served as Vice-President of Radnite-Mattel Productions. His youngest son, John Levee, was a painter who lived in Paris. M. C. Levee's second marriage was to Trudy Levee. He died at the age of 81 from cancer in Palm Springs, California.

Career
Levee began his career in the film industry by working as a prop man at Fox Film Corporation in 1917, earning $20 a week working on A Tale of Two Cities. Within a year, Levee became the assistant to Abe Carles, the General Superintendent at Fox. Levee left Fox in 1920 in order to become a business man at Robert Brunton Studios with Robert Brunton.

In 1920, Levee organized United Studios, serving as President. While working at United Studios, Levee produced The Isle of Lost Ships (1923), The White Moth (1924), starring Barbara La Marr, and Sweet Daddies (1926). In April 1926, Levee sold United Studios to Paramount Pictures. Levee then joined First National, also known as Warner Bros., in order to build more studio facilities in Burbank. Levee joined Nicholas Schenck as General Studio and Business Manager until 1929, when he left to become Executive Manager at Paramount. In 1932, Levee was let go by Sam Jaffe, the General Production Manager, who believed he could cover both jobs. Levee was also the founder and first President of Artists Management Guild.

In the 1930s Levee started the M.C. Levee Agency directly after working at United Artists. He ran a one-man business with no staff or organization. He had several important clients, most of which were from Warner Brothers. Most agents do not stick to one studio, it was simply a coincidence that Levee's client base were all working under Warner Brothers. Because he had several large clients, Levee was very well off. Some of Levee's star clients included Mary Pickford, Joan Crawford, Merle Oberson, Bette Davis, Paul Muni, Jeanette MacDonald, Leslie Howard, Greer Garson, Claude Rains, Dick Powell, and Franchot Tone. He was also the agent of creators Cecil B. DeMille, Frank Borzage, and Mervyn LeRoy. Robert Cowan referred to Levee as being a fair and reliable agent.

Founding the Academy of Motion Picture Arts and Sciences 
In 1927, the Academy of Motion Picture Arts and Sciences was founded in order to improve the media industry without receiving government help. The founders knew they could create a stronger industry by establishing unity between all groups such as writers, directors, and technicians. With such exponential growth in American film, the industry also desperately needed a standardization of equipment and techniques. The founders saw that gathering a group of professionals together could create a positive response to the issues facing the industry and so the Academy of Motion Picture Arts and Sciences was born.

Levee was considered one of the fathers of the Academy alongside Douglas Fairbanks, Conrad Nagel, Milton Sills, William C. deMille and Thalberg. Much of the work Levee did for the Academy was for little or no pay, working simply for the good of the Academy. Levee, along with the other 35 founding members had great hope for what the Academy could become for the film industry. They hoped to establish a professional society which might work toward the betterment of the motion picture industry. M.C. Levee believed in the objectives of the academy.

Levee served as treasurer of the Academy for 12 years. He was the founder and President of the Permanent Charities Committee of the film industry, one of the many different organizations created within AMPAS in order to get the view on all sides. In early March 1933, Levee resigned from the Board of Directors of the Academy as a statement that the business was being run into the ground by the studio executives and Wall Street bankers who ran the industry.

Awards 
Honorary Life Member of Artists Management Guild (1958)

References 

Books:
Bergan, Ronald. (1986) The United Artists Story. New York: Crown Publishers. 
Bell, Douglas. (1997) An Oral History with Eugene Zukor. Academy of Motion Picture Arts and Sciences, Oral History Program.
Hall, Barbara. (1995) An Oral History with Robert Cowan. Academy of Motion Picture Arts and Sciences, Oral History Program.
Hall, Barbara. (1992) An Oral History with Sam Jaffe. Academy of Motion Picture Arts and Sciences, Oral History Program.
Kennedy, Joseph P. (1927) The Story of Films. New York: A.W. Shaw Company, p. 5.
Sands, Piere N. (1973) A Historical Study of The Academy of Motion Picture Arts and Sciences (1927–1947). New York: Arno Press. 

Periodicals:
Baily, Tom. Introduction for M.C. Levee to the Academy of Motion Picture Arts and Sciences. Paramount.
Beverly Hills, California: Special Collections, Margaret Herrick Library, Fairbanks Motion Picture Research Center, Academy of Motion Picture Arts and Sciences.
Gillette, Don C. Hollywood Reporter. 19 Jan. 1966.
Hollywood Reporter. 26 May 1972.

Online:
Nicholas M. Schenck. Accessed 20 Nov. 2008.

External links

Credit 

Supported by an Undergraduate Research Opportunity Program grant from the University of Notre Dame, Institute for Scholarship in the Humanities.

1891 births
1972 deaths
Businesspeople from Baltimore
American film producers
Presidents of the Academy of Motion Picture Arts and Sciences
20th-century American businesspeople